Events from the year 2012 in Uruguay

Incumbents 
 President: José Mujica
 Vice President: Danilo Astori

Events

January 2012

Sport 
 13 to 15 January – 2012 Copa Bimbo
 27 July to 12 August – Uruguay at the 2012 Summer Olympics in London, United Kingdom

Unknown dates 
 2011–12 Uruguayan Primera División season

Deaths in 2012

January 
 1 January – Nina Miranda, 86, tango singer and composer. (born 1925)

References 

 
2010s in Uruguay
Years of the 21st century in Uruguay
Uruguay
Uruguay